Jiangsu Zenith Steel Women's Volleyball Club is a Nanjing-based professional volleyball team competing in the Chinese Volleyball League. As the provincial team it represents Jiangsu at national competitions. The team won their first league champion title in season 2016/17.

CVL results

National Games of China results

Team roster (Season of 2018-2019)

Sponsorship

Retired players
  Chen Yayun
  Lu Qian 
  Mao Junan
  Qiu Aihua   
  Ren Jing   
  Sun Jinfang, Captain of the Chinese national team (1977-1982).
  Sun Yue, Olympic silver medalist, Captain of the Chinese national team (1999-2000).
  Wang Zunyi
  Xue Xiaoya
  Zhang Zhongyu
  Zhao Yun  
  Li Hui
  Zhai Tingli
  Wang Wei
  Wang Xueting
  Meng Xinghan
  Hui Ruoqi, Captain of the Chinese national team (2013-2016).

Chinese volleyball clubs